Mustafa Hasanagić (born 20 April 1941) is a Serbian former football manager and player.

Club career
After starting out at his hometown club FAP, Hasanagić moved to Yugoslav First League side Partizan in 1961. He spent eight seasons with the Crno-beli and won three championship titles (1961–62, 1962–63, and 1964–65). In total, Hasanagić played 104 games in the top flight and scored 56 times in the process, finishing as the league's top scorer in 1966–67. He also helped the team reach the European Cup final in 1966, contributing with six goals. In 1969, Hasanagić went abroad to Switzerland to play for Servette. He also spent one season with fellow Swiss club La Chaux-de-Fonds before returning to FAP.

International career
At international level, Hasanagić was capped five times for Yugoslavia between 1965 and 1967.

Managerial career
After hanging up his boots, Hasanagić served as manager of several clubs, most notably Ankaragücü in Turkey during the 1970s.

Honours
Partizan
 Yugoslav First League: 1961–62, 1962–63, 1964–65
Individual
 Yugoslav First League Top Scorer: 1966–67

References

External links

 
 
 

1941 births
Living people
People from Priboj
Bosniaks of Serbia
Yugoslav footballers
Serbian footballers
Association football forwards
Yugoslavia international footballers
FK FAP players
FK Partizan players
Servette FC players
FC La Chaux-de-Fonds players
Yugoslav First League players
Swiss Super League players
Yugoslav expatriate footballers
Expatriate footballers in Switzerland
Yugoslav expatriate sportspeople in Switzerland
Yugoslav football managers
Serbian football managers
MKE Ankaragücü managers
Süper Lig managers
Yugoslav expatriate football managers
Expatriate football managers in Turkey
Yugoslav expatriate sportspeople in Turkey